Alone with Me may refer to:

Music
 "Alone with Me", a song from the musical Hands on a Hardbody (2012)
 "Alone with Me", a song by Cher Lloyd from Sorry I'm Late (2014)
 "Alone with Me", a song by This Wild Life from Clouded (2014)
 "Alone with Me", a song by Vance Joy from Nation of Two (2018)

Books
 Alone with Me: A New Autobiography by Eartha Kitt (1976)